Samuel Okai (born 6 June 1936) is a Ghanaian footballer. He competed in the men's tournament at the 1964 Summer Olympics.

References

External links
 
 

1936 births
Living people
Ghanaian footballers
Ghana international footballers
Olympic footballers of Ghana
Footballers at the 1964 Summer Olympics
Place of birth missing (living people)
Association football defenders